Boronia grimshawii is a plant in the citrus family Rutaceae and is endemic to mountain ranges in central Queensland, Australia. It is an erect shrub with many branches, simple leaves with a densely hairy, pale underside, and pink, four-petalled flowers.

Description
The lower surface of the leaf is a slightly paler colour than the upper surface. The eight stamens alternate in length with those opposite the petals shorter than those near a sepal.

Taxonomy and naming
Boronia grimshawii was first formally described in 2003 by Marco F. Duretto and the description was published in the journal Muelleria from a specimen collected near the property "Bronte Station". The specific epithet (grimshawii) honours the Australian botanist Paul Grimshaw.

Distribution and habitat
This boronia grows in woodland but is only known from a single population on an eroded hillside on private property near Gayndah in south-east Queensland.

Conservation
Boronia grimshawii is classed as "vulnerable" under the Queensland Government Nature Conservation Act 1992.

References 

grimshawii
Flora of Queensland
Plants described in 2003
Taxa named by Marco Duretto